Georgios Apostolidis (born 22 June 1995) is a Greek professional footballer who plays as a left winger.

Career
Apostolidis started his football career in the youth ranks of PAOK, before moving to city rivals' Iraklis youth system. A string of good performances with Iraklis' U–20 team earned him his first professional contract with the side. He made his debut for Iraklis, coming on as a late substitute for Benjamin Onwuachi, in a 2–1 home win against Aiginiakos. In the summer of 2014, after being released from Iraklis, he signed for Football League 2 club Kampaniakos.

References

External links
 myplayer.gr profile

Living people
1995 births
Greek footballers
Greek expatriate footballers
Iraklis Thessaloniki F.C. players
Kozani F.C. players
Association football midfielders
Footballers from Thessaloniki